The 2017 NASCAR K&N Pro Series West was the sixty-fourth season of the K&N Pro Series West, a regional stock car racing series sanctioned by NASCAR. It began with the NAPA Auto Parts Tucson 150 at Tucson Speedway on March 18 and concluded with the West Coast Stock Car Hall of Fame Championship 150 presented by NAPA Auto Parts at Kern County Raceway Park on November 4. Todd Gilliland was the defending drivers' champion and he won the championship again in 2017, becoming the first back-to-back champion in the West Series since Mike Duncan in 2004 and 2005.

Drivers

Notes

Schedule

All of the races in the 2017 season were televised on NBCSN and were on a tape delay basis.

Notes

Results and standings

Races

Notes
1 – Starting grid was set by the fastest lap times from the first NAPA Auto Parts Twin 100 race.

Drivers' championship

(key) Bold – Pole position awarded by time. Italics – Pole position set by final practice results or Owners' points. * – Most laps led.

Notes
1 – Dan O'Donnell and Kevin O'Connell received championship points, despite the fact that they did not start the race.
2 – Scored points towards the K&N Pro Series East.

See also

2017 Monster Energy NASCAR Cup Series
2017 NASCAR Xfinity Series
2017 NASCAR Camping World Truck Series
2017 NASCAR K&N Pro Series East
2017 NASCAR Whelen Modified Tour
2017 NASCAR Pinty's Series
2017 NASCAR PEAK Mexico Series
2017 NASCAR Whelen Euro Series

References

ARCA Menards Series West